Ceiba speciosa, the floss silk tree (formerly Chorisia speciosa), is a species of deciduous tree that is native to the tropical and subtropical forests of South America. It has several local common names, such as palo borracho (in Spanish literally "drunken stick"), or  árbol del puente, samu'ũ (in Guarani), or paineira (in Brazilian Portuguese). In Bolivia, it is called toborochi, meaning "tree of refuge" or "sheltering tree". In the USA it often is called the silk floss tree. It belongs to the same family as the baobab and the kapok. Another tree of the same genus, Ceiba chodatii, is often referred to by the same common names.

Description
The natural habitat of the floss silk tree is in the northeast of Argentina, east of Bolivia, Paraguay, Uruguay, and southern Brazil. It is resistant to drought and moderate cold. The trunk is studded with thick, sharp conical prickles that deter wild animals from climbing the trees. In younger trees, the trunk is green due to its high chlorophyll content, which makes it capable of performing photosynthesis when leaves are absent; with age it turns to gray.

Leaves, stems, and flowers
The branches tend to be horizontal and also are covered with prickles. The leaves are composed of five to seven long leaflets. The flowers are creamy-whitish in the center and pink toward the tips of their five petals. They measure  in diameter and their shape is superficially similar to hibiscus flowers. Their nectar is known to attract insect pollinators and hummingbirds. C. speciosa flowers are in bloom between February and May (in its native Southern Hemisphere), but it may bloom at other times of the year, even as late as November in Florida. The flowers of the related C. chodatii are similar in form and size, but their color goes from creamy white centers to yellow tips.  As a deciduous tree, it is completely bare of leaves and flowers during the winter months, especially when growing outside of its native South American habitat.

Flowers closeup

Fruits

Uses
The "cotton" inside the capsules, although not so good quality as that of the kapok tree, has been used as stuffing (density = 0.27 g/cm3).  The wood can be used to make canoes, as wood pulp, and to make paper. The bark has been used to make ropes. From the seeds, it is possible to obtain vegetable oil (both edible and industrially useful).

The floss silk tree is cultivated mostly for ornamental purposes. Outside of private gardens around the world, it is often planted along urban streets in subtropical areas such as in Spain, South Africa, Australia, northern New Zealand, and the southern USA, although its prickled trunks and limbs require establishing safety buffer zones around the tree in order to protect people and domesticated animals.

Ceiba speciosa is added to some versions of the hallucinogenic drink Ayahuasca.

Gallery

References

External links

 Brief description of the tree.
 Subtropicals growing in Kerikeri - A report on C. speciosa as cultivated in New Zealand.
 Ceiba gallery - Many pictures of trees of the genus Ceiba.

speciosa
Trees of Argentina
Trees of Brazil
Trees of Paraguay
Flora of the Amazon
Flora of the Atlantic Forest
Garden plants of South America
Ornamental trees
Trees of Peru